Bertha is an unincorporated community in Seminole County, Florida, United States.

Notes

Unincorporated communities in Seminole County, Florida
Unincorporated communities in Florida